Gergő Ominger (born 25 September 2002) is a Hungarian football midfielder who plays for Nemzeti Bajnokság II club Csákvár on loan from Puskás Akadémia.

Career statistics
.

References

External links
 
 

2001 births
Living people
People from Győr
Hungarian footballers
Hungary youth international footballers
Association football midfielders
Puskás Akadémia FC players
Puskás Akadémia FC II players
Csákvári TK players
Nemzeti Bajnokság I players
Nemzeti Bajnokság II players
Nemzeti Bajnokság III players
21st-century Hungarian people